The School of Media and Cultural Studies, (SMCS) is a part of the Tata Institute of Social Sciences in India, engaged in media teaching, film production, research and dissemination. The school was in the news recently because some of their students produced a documentary film Caste on the Menu Card which was not given permission to screen.

Awards 
SMCS films have won several awards.

Digital archive 
SMCS has a digital archive of films, video footage and photographs. It has a collection of over 2500 films.

The focus areas of the archive are:
 Development, including issues of globalization, marginalized groups, environment, disasters, movements,
 Ethnographic film from India and other countries

References

External links 

 Do Din Ka Mela- A new film on Murra Lala and Kanji Rana, set in Kutch
 [http://ourfamily2007.wordpress.com/ Our Family 
 SheWrite
 Naata
 Saacha
 Irani Restaurant Instructions
 Kahankar:Ahankar

Cultural studies organizations
Tata institutions